Live in Stockholm is a live EP by John Norum, the guitarist in the Swedish hard rock band Europe. It was released in 1990.

Track listing
"Eternal Flame" – 3:40 (John Norum, Marcel Jacob)
"Don't Believe a Word" – 3:00 (Phil Lynott)
"Bad Reputation" – 3:51 (Brian Downey, Scott Gorham, Phil Lynott) (Japanese bonus track)
"Blind" – 3:53 (John Norum, Marcel Jacob)
"Free Birds in Flight" (studio recording) – 3:00 (John Norum)

The first 4 live tracks were recorded at the Draken in Stockholm on 14 March 1988. The instrumental song "Free Birds in Flight", previously unreleased, was recorded at Stockholm Recording in 1987.

Personnel 
John Norum – Guitars, lead and backing vocals on tracks 2 & 3
Göran Edman – Lead vocals on tracks 1 & 4
Marcel Jacob – Bass
Henrik Hildén – Drums
Peter Hermansson – Drums
Mats Lindfors – Rhythm guitar, keyboards, backing vocals
Per Blom – Keyboards

Album credits 
Produced by: John Norum
Mixed by: Per Blom for Peak Productions

John Norum albums
1990 EPs
Live EPs
1990 live albums